Gleadless Townend is an outer city district of Sheffield centred on the junction of the ring road, White Lane (B6054) and Gleadless Road (B6388).

Transport
Gleadless Townend is served by several bus routes and two routes of the Sheffield Supertram light rail network, forming a minor transport interchange.

Bus routes serving Gleadless Townend include First South Yorkshire's 18 and 51 routes and TM Travel's 252 service.

Gleadless Townend tram stop is a Supertram stop on both the Blue and Purple routes. It was opened on 5 December 1994, with a full service on all lines launched from 3 April 1995.

On 20 September 2008, a 75-year-old woman was seriously injured when she fell and was struck by a tram arriving at the tram stop. She was transferred to the Northern General Hospital, suffering from head injuries and a fractured pelvis and leg.

References

Areas of Sheffield